The Toronto Rock are a lacrosse team based in Toronto playing in the National Lacrosse League (NLL). The 2014 season was the 17th in franchise history, and 16th as the Rock.

After an up-and-down start to the season, the Rock acquired goaltender Brandon Miller from the Philadelphia Wings at the trade deadline hoping to revitalize their shaky defense. 

On April 5, star forward Garrett Billings tore his ACL during a game against the Vancouver Stealth and was lost for the remainder of the season. Despite losing the league's scoring leader, the Rock won that game, which started a four-game winning streak to finish the regular season and clinch second place in the Eastern division ahead of the slumping Buffalo Bandits. But the Bandits ended their 8-game losing streak by beating the Rock in the division semi-finals, 15–3.

Regular season

Final standings

Game log

Regular season
Reference:

Playoffs

Roster

See also
2014 NLL season

References

Toronto
2014 in Toronto
2014 in Canadian sports